The Malaysia national rugby sevens team is a minor national sevens side. They have competed in the Hong Kong Sevens since the 1980s.
Malaysia also qualified for the 2010 Commonwealth Games.

Tournament history

Rugby World Cup Sevens

Commonwealth Games

Asian Games

Southeast Asian Games

Sri Lanka Rugby 7s
{| class="wikitable"
|-
!width=40|Year
!width=165|Cup
!width=165|Plate
!width=165|Bowl
|-
|1999||||||
|-
|2000|||||| 
|-
|2001||||||
|-
|2002||||||
|-
|2003||||||
|-
|2004||||||
|-
|2005||||||
|-
|2006||||||
|-
|2007||||||
|-
|2008||||||
|}

Rugby at the 2002 Asian Games
Group A matches -

September 30

Squad

Current squad
Squad to 2017 Southeast Asian Games
Mohamad Khairul Abdillah bin Ramli
Mohamad Nur Azri bin Azmi
Mohamad Safwan bin Abdullah
Muhamad Firdaus bin Tarmizi
Muhammad Ameer Nasrun Zulkeffli
Muhammad Siddiq Amir bin Jalil
Muhammad Zulhisham bin Rasli
Muhd Azwan Zuwairi bin Mat Zizi
Muhd Dzafran Asyraaf bin Muhd Zainudin
Nik Mohd Shahiddan bin Mohd Zain
Wan Izzuddin bin Ismail
Zulkiflee bin Azmi

Past squad
Squad to 2014 Asian Games:
Anwarrul Aswad Ahmad
Anwarul Hafiz Ahmad
Dinesvaran Krishnan
Mohd Fairuz Abdul Rahman
Mohd Izwan Abu Bakar
Muhammad Ameer Nasrun Zulkeffli
Muhammad Danial Noor Hamidi
Muhammad Faridzal Ismail
Muhammad Hanafi Zaini
Nazuriddin Abdul Latiff
Wanizzuddin Ismail
Zulkiflee Azmi

References
 McLaren, Bill A Visit to Hong Kong in Starmer-Smith, Nigel & Robertson, Ian (eds) The Whitbread Rugby World '90 (Lennard Books, 1989)

Rugby union in Malaysia
Malaysia national rugby union team
National rugby sevens teams